These are the Canadian number-one albums of 2015. The chart is compiled by Nielsen Soundscan and published by Jam! Canoe, issued every Sunday. The chart also appears in Billboard magazine as Top Canadian Albums.

Note that Billboard publishes charts with an issue date approximately 7–10 days in advance.

Number-one albums

See also 
List of Canadian Hot 100 number-one singles of 2015
List of number-one digital songs of 2015 (Canada)

References

External links 
 Top 100 albums in Canada on Jam
 Billboard Top Canadian Albums

2015
Canada Albums
2015 in Canadian music